Babygrande Presents: The Pharaoh Philes (most commonly known as The Pharaoh Philes is the second compilation album from hip hop supergroup Army of the Pharaohs, it was officially released 14 June 2010. Artists including; Vinnie Paz, Apathy, Esoteric, Celph Titled, Des Devious, King Syze amongst others were all featured on the album.

Non members of the group including Snowgoons, Lord Digga and Random Luck were also featured on the album.

Track listing

References

Army of the Pharaohs albums
2010 compilation albums
Hip hop compilation albums
Babygrande Records albums